Arik Cannon (born December 23, 1981) is an American professional wrestler known for competing in companies such as Chikara, Dragon Gate USA, IWA Mid-South, All American Wrestling and Wrestling Society X. He also runs the Minneapolis-based wrestling promotion F1RST Wrestling, and is also the only wrestler officially sponsored by Pabst Blue Ribbon.

Professional wrestling career

IWA Mid-South (2002–2004) 
Arik Cannon was trained at Midwest Pro Wrestling and is known for wrestling in IWA Mid-South. There, he became the IWA Mid-South Heavyweight Champion by defeating Petey Williams in the Ted Petty Invitational Tournament. He defended it against Roderick Strong and Austin Aries, but was forced to give it up due to injury in 2004.

Chikara (2005–2006) 

He returned to wrestling in 2005 and entered Chikara's Tag World Grand Prix 2005 with partner Claudio Castagnoli and made it to the finals to face Superfriends, Chris Hero and Mike Quackenbush. That night, Hero turned on Quackenbush and joined Cannon and Castagnoli, leading Cannon and Castagnoli to win the Tag World Grand Prix. The three began calling themselves The Kings of Wrestling. The began feuding with Quackenbush, but Cannon left the group in 2005. Cannon competed in the Tag World Grand Prix 2006 with Jigsaw as his partner, but lost in the second round. During June 2006, Arik Cannon wrestled in Chikara's fourth annual Young Lions Cup tournament. In the final round, he defeated Cheech to win the tournament. At Chikara's Cibernetico Forever event in October 2006, however, Max Boyer managed to beat him for the Cup.

Wrestling Society X (2006–2007) 
In November 2006, Arik Cannon partook in the Wrestling Society X promotion's first season of television tapings, which later aired on MTV.

Dragon Gate (2007–2008) 
In October 2007, Cannon went to Japan for a tour with Dragon Gate and was brought into the Muscle Outlawz faction by Naruki Doi along with fellow gaijins Kevin Steen and Jimmy Rave.

Dragon Gate USA (2009–2015) 
On September 6, 2009, Cannon made his debut for Dragon Gate USA at the tapings of the promotion's second pay-per-view titled Untouchable. He would wrestle in an eight-way dark match, which was won by Johnny Gargano. After making several appearances for the promotion in 2010, Cannon was entered into the Breakout Challenge tournament on April 1, 2011. After defeating A. R. Fox, Facade and Shiima Xion in his first round match, Cannon defeated Jimmy Rave in the finals to win the tournament. Two days later at Open the Ultimate Gate, Cannon and Sami Callihan wrestled in a six–way match, before deciding to walk out on the match. Later in the event, Cannon and Callihan announced they would be forming a tag team named the D.U.F. (Dirty Ugly Fucks) and defeated the Dark City Fight Club (Jon Davis and Kory Chavis) in their first match together. On June 5 at Enter The Dragon 2011, Cannon and Callihan were joined by Pinkie Sanchez, before picking up a major win over the tag team of Open the Dream Gate Champion Masaaki Mochizuki and Susumu Yokosuka.

F1RST Wrestling (2007–present) 
In 2007, Cannon founded the Minneapolis-based promotion F1RST Wrestling, which hosts its flagship "Wrestlepalooza" events at Minneapolis' First Avenue nightclub. In more recent years, the promotion has expanded to host events at an eclectic assortment of locations throughout the Twin Cities metropolitan area, including the James Ballentine VFW  and Temple of Aaron Synagogue. Several performers from F1RST Wrestling have found later success in larger promotions, such as Seth Rollins, the Top Flight tag team of brothers Darius Martin and Dante Martin, and Ariya Daivari.

WWE (2017) 
In 2017, Cannon appeared on the March 7 episode of 205 Live. He was introduced by Brian Kendrick as Bryan Kendrick and lost to Akira Tozawa.

AEW (2021-2022) 

In 2021, Cannon had two matches with AEW. First was June 5 where he teamed up with Kevin Blackwood in a tag match and faced Eddie Kingston & Penta El Zero Miedo in a loss on Dark Elevation in Jacksonville Florida. His second match was also a tag match in front of his home crowd in Minneapolis Minnesota on November 12, where he and Renny D took on The Pinnacle members Wardlow & Shawn Spears. The fans in attendance were loudly cheering for Arik and chanting his name loudly. This also was a loss. A 0-2 overall record in AEW as of 2021, he was not pinned in both of his matches.

On August 10, 2022 Cannon teamed with Travis Titan for a tag match taped for Dark Elevation during the Quake at the Lake special. Cannon and Titan lost to Josh Woods and Tony Neese.  Again fans cheered his name loudly during the match.

Personal life 
Cannon was an assistant coach at The Academy: School of Professional Wrestling, a training facility led by WWE alumni Shawn Daivari and Ken Anderson.

Championships and accomplishments 
3X Wrestling
3XW Cruiserweight Championship (1 time)
3XW Pure Wrestling Championship (1 time)
All American Wrestling
AAW Heritage Championship (2 times)
AAW Tag Team Championship (1 time) – with Jimmy Jacobs
Chikara
Young Lions Cup IV
Tag World Grand Prix (2005) – with Claudio Castagnoli
Dragon Gate USA
Breakout Challenge (2011)
Dreamwave Wrestling
Dreamwave Alternative Championship (1 time)
Dreamwave Tag Team Championship (1 time) – with Darin Corbin
F1RST Wrestling
WrestlePalooza Championship (1 time)
Fully Loaded Wrestling
FLW Cup (2017)
Heavy on Wrestling
HOW Undisputed Championship (1 time, current)
Independent Wrestling Association Mid-South
IWA Mid-South Heavyweight Championship (2 times)
Midwest Pro Wrestling
MPW Cruiserweight Championship (3 times)
MPW Universal Championship (1 time)
MPW Universal Championship Tournament (2004)
Northern Impact Wrestling
NIW Impact Championship (1 time)
Pro Wrestling Illustrated
PWI ranked him #200 of the top 500 singles wrestlers in the PWI 500 in 2011
Pro Wrestling Phoenix
PWP Heavyweight Championship (1 time
Steel Domain Wrestling
SDW Tag Team Championships (1 time) – with AJ LaRock

References

External links 

American male professional wrestlers
Living people
1981 births
Professional wrestling promoters
Jewish professional wrestlers
20th-century American Jews
21st-century American Jews
21st-century professional wrestlers
AAW Heritage Champions
AAW Tag Team Champions